Crunchyroll began simulcasting the series in October 2014, starting with episode 754.

Seasons overview 
These "seasons" are based on the Japanese DVDs released by Shogakukan starting on February 24, 2006. (see Home media release section) In Japan, Case Closed runs continuously on TV with very few weeks off.

Episode list

Season 31: 2021–present

Home media release
The Region 2 DVD compilations of the Detective Conan anime are released by Shogakukan and grouped by parts.

References
General

Notes

Specific

External links
 
Case Closed official website at Funimation

3
Lists of television episodes